The London and North Eastern Railway (LNER) was formed out of a number of constituent railway companies at the grouping in 1923.

Main companies
The main companies, showing their route mileage, were:
 Great Eastern Railway (GER)  miles (1,906 km) 
 Great Central Railway (GCR)  miles (1,364 km)
 Great Northern Railway (GNR)  miles (1,680 km)
 Great North of Scotland Railway (GNSR)  miles (535 km)
 Hull and Barnsley Railway  miles (170 km) (H&BR) (which had amalgamated with the NER on 1 April 1922) 
 North British Railway  (NBR)
 North Eastern Railway  miles (2,812 km) (NER)

Subsidiary companies

Independently operated lines
 Colne Valley and Halstead Railway 
 East and West Yorkshire Union Railway  miles (15 km)
 Mid-Suffolk Light Railway  miles (31 km)

Leased or worked railways
Many of these "railways" existed only in name; there were included on the list at the time of the Railways Act in order to legally qualify each line's position 
 Originally leased to or worked by the NER
 Brackenhill Light Railway (West Yorkshire)
 Fawcett Depot line (County Durham)  miles (9 km)
 Great North of England, Clarence and Hartlepool Junction line  miles (10 km)
 Originally leased to or worked by the GCR
 Humber Commercial Railway and Dock 
 Mansfield Railway 
 North Lindsey Light Railway 
 Seaforth and Sefton Junction Railway 
 Sheffield District Railway  miles (7 km)
 Originally leased to or worked by the GER
 London and Blackwall Railway 
 Originally leased to or worked by the GNR
 East Lincolnshire Railway  miles (76 km)
 Horncastle Railway  miles (12 km)
 Nottingham and Grantham Railway and Canal 
 Nottingham Suburban line 
 Stamford and Essendine Railway  miles (20 km)
 Originally leased to or worked by the NBR
 Edinburgh and Bathgate Railway  miles (16 km)
 Forth and Clyde Junction Railway  miles (49 km)
 Gifford & Garvald Railway  miles (15 km)
 Glasgow and Milngavie Junction Railway  miles (5 km)
 Kilsyth and Bonnybridge railway  miles (14 km) (worked jointly with CalR)
 Lauder Light Railway  miles (16 km)
 Newburgh and North Fife Railway  miles (21 km)
 Originally leased to or worked by H&BR
 South Yorkshire Junction Railway  miles (18 km)
 Originally leased to or worked by several constituent companies
 Nottingham Joint Station Committee
 West Riding and Grimsby Railway  miles (52 km)

Independently operated joint companies
 East London Railway: jointly leased by the LNER, Southern Railway, Metropolitan Railway (MetR) and District Railway. Traffic operated by MetR (passenger); LNER (goods)
 Cheshire Lines Committee (CLC): Operated jointly by LNER/London, Midland and Scottish Railway (LMS). LNER supplies locomotive power; CLC own rolling stock 
 Manchester, South Junction and Altrincham Railway: trains worked by both LNER/LMSR

Joint railways

Now totally LNER
 Great Northern and Great Eastern Joint Railway 
 Hull and Barnsley and Great Central Joint Railway

Joint with LMS
 Axholme Joint Railway 
 Cheshire Lines Committee ( share) 
 Caledonian and Dunbartonshire Junction Railway (including Loch Lomond steamers) 
 Dundee and Arbroath Railway (including Carmyllie Light Railway) 
 Great Central and Midland Joint Railway 
 Great Central & North Staffordshire Joint Railway 
 Great Northern and London and North Western Joint Railway 
 Halifax and Ovenden Junction Railway 
 Methley Railway ( share) 
 Midland and Great Northern Joint Railway 
 Norfolk and Suffolk Joint Railway ( share) 
 Oldham, Ashton and Guide Bridge Railway  
 Otley & Ilkley Railway 
 Perth General Station ( share)
 Prince's Dock, Glasgow ( share) 
 South Yorkshire Joint Railway ( share) 
 Swinton and Knottingley Joint Railway 
 Tottenham & Hampstead Junction Railway

Joint with GWR
 Great Western and Great Central Joint Railway 

Big four British railway companies
Pre-grouping British railway companies
Constituents of the London and North Eastern Railway